West Virginia Route 18 is a north–south state highway in the northwestern portion of the U.S. state of West Virginia. The southern terminus of the route is at West Virginia Route 47 in Troy, Gilmer County. The northern terminus is at the Sistersville Ferry on Catherine St in Sistersville, Tyler County. WV 18 uses Charles St, Main St and Catherine St through Sistersville to reach the ferry. As of September 2015, WVDOH signage does not show WV 18 on WV 2.

Major intersections

References

018
West Virginia Route 018
West Virginia Route 018
West Virginia Route 018